Carl Alfred Erhardt (15 February 1897 in Beckenham, Kent, United Kingdom – 3 May 1988) was an English ice hockey player who captained the British national team to numerous international championships in the 1930s, including Olympic gold at the 1936 Winter Olympics in Garmisch-Partenkirchen.

Early years 
Unlike most British hockey players of the era, Erhardt did not grow up in Canada. Rather, he learned the game of hockey while attending school in Germany and Switzerland as a boy. Erhardt was a passionate defenseman, sometimes playing in excess of 40 minutes each game.  An excellent athlete, Erhardt also excelled at tennis, skiing and water-skiing. (He founded the British Water Ski Federation.)

National team success 

Erhardt was a member of the European and World Championship teams in 1931, the World Championship team in 1934 and 1935, and the captain of the team which won the European and World Championships, along with Olympic gold, in 1936. Of the twelve members of the 1936 team, Erhardt was one of only two that had not either been born or learned the game in Canada. Thirty-nine years old at the time, Erhardt is the oldest man ever to win an Olympic gold in ice hockey.  The British defeated the prohibitive favourites, the Canadians, in capturing Great Britain's first and only gold medal in ice hockey.

Retirement 
After his Olympic success, Erhardt retired from hockey. He wrote a book in 1937 titled Ice Hockey, became a referee, and joined the council of the British Ice Hockey Association, of which he became a lifetime vice-president. Erhardt was elected to the British Ice Hockey Hall of Fame in 1950, and was posthumously elected to the International Ice Hockey Federation Hall of Fame in 1998. In 2012, the UK Elite Ice Hockey League (EIHL) named one of its two newly introduced conferences after him.

See also 
 Ice hockey at the 1936 Winter Olympics

References 
 Playing Games with the Nazis
 Carl Erhardt at Ice Hockey Journalists UK
 A to Z Encyclopaedia of Hockey 

1897 births
1988 deaths
British Ice Hockey Hall of Fame inductees
English ice hockey players
English Olympic medallists
Great Britain men's national ice hockey team coaches
Ice hockey players at the 1936 Winter Olympics
IIHF Hall of Fame inductees
Olympic ice hockey players of Great Britain
Olympic gold medallists for Great Britain
People from Beckenham
Olympic medalists in ice hockey
Medalists at the 1936 Winter Olympics
Sportspeople from London
Sportspeople from Kent